The Riddlesworth Stakes was a flat horse race in Great Britain open to three-year-olds. It was run on the Abington Mile at Newmarket over a distance of 1 mile (1,609 metres), and was scheduled to take place each year in early or mid April on the Monday of the Craven meeting.

In its early years the race was considered one of the great stakes races of the British racing season and was as important and prestigious as the races now known as the British Classic Races. In most years it carried more prize money than either the 1000 Guineas or the 2000 Guineas. The race underwent several modifications in its history. From 1820 until 1823 it was run as two separate races, one for colts and one for fillies. From 1834 a second Riddlesworth Stakes was run on the Tuesday of the Craven meeting. After the 1830s the race declined in importance.

Winners to 1841

References

Flat races in Great Britain
Newmarket Racecourse
Flat horse races for three-year-olds
Recurring sporting events established in 1815
1815 establishments in England
Discontinued horse races